Cyprazepam is a drug which is a sedative-hypnotic benzodiazepine derivative. It has anxiolytic properties, and presumably also has hypnotic, skeletal muscle relaxant, anticonvulsant and amnestic properties.

Synthesis
The lactam moiety in benzodiazepams is active towards nucleophiles and numerous analogues have been made by exploiting this fact.

For example, heating demoxepam with N-cyclopropylmethylamine leads to amidine formation, the minor tranquilizer cyprazepam.

See also 
Benzodiazepine

References 

Benzodiazepines
Chloroarenes
GABAA receptor positive allosteric modulators
Cyclopropyl compounds